Walter French may refer to:

Walter French (baseball) (1899–1984), American outfielder, football halfback and baseball coach
Walter French (cricket umpire) (before 1905–1961), Australian cricket umpire
Walter John French (1868–1937), British trade unionist and politician
Walter M. French, justice of the Washington Supreme Court

See also
French (surname)